Bajer may refer to:

Fredrik Bajer (1837–1922), Danish Nobel Peace Prize laureate
Tomasz Bajer (born 1971), Polish visual artist 
Lukáš Bajer (born 1984), Czech footballer
Bajer Bridge, on the A6 motorway in Gorski Kotar, Croatia